is a Japanese actress, model, television personality, singer, and voice actress. In 2005, she became the only seventh generation member of the Japanese idol girl group Morning Musume, a part of Hello! Project.

While Kusumi was in Morning Musume, she provided the voice for Kirari Tsukishima, the main character of the anime series Kirarin Revolution, and portrayed her in real life on Oha Suta. In addition, she was featured in several musical releases affiliated with the series, including both solo releases under the name  and group releases for the units Kira Pika and Milky Way.

After leaving Morning Musume in 2009, Kusumi pursued modeling, discussing her career changes in her 2011 autobiography, 17-sai no Tenshoku. After making her runway debut in 2011, she modeled exclusively for magazines CanCam and Steady, while also making regular appearances on variety shows. At the same time, Kusumi continued to perform at music events and took part in Dream Morning Musume. Kusumi also ventured into acting, appearing in shows such as Woman Prisoner 7 and Doctor-X: Surgeon Michiko Daimon.

Early life
Koharu Kusumi was born in Ojimaya, Washima Village in Niigata Prefecture, and grew up in a rural neighborhood. Her family consisted of her parents, an older sister, and an older brother. Around the middle of elementary school, Kusumi became interested in modeling from reading magazines like CanCam. Prior to joining Morning Musume, Kusumi was the captain of her school's volleyball team.

Career

2005-2009: Morning Musume, Kirarin Revolution
In 2005, after seeing an audition call for new members for the Japanese idol group Morning Musume in a magazine, Kusumi considered applying after noticing she was eligible based on the minimum age requirements to participate. With her sister's help, Kusumi auditioned in secret with the song "As a Person" by Tomomi Kahara. She sang "Furusato" during the final audition and was selected for the group as the only seventh generation member, a feat which earned her the nickname "Miracle" from producer Tsunku. Kusumi debuted on the single "Iroppoi Jirettai" and was one of the founding members of Hello! Project's kickball team, Metro Rabbits H.P., in 2006.

In April 2006, Kusumi was cast as the voice actress for Kirari Tsukishima, the main character in the anime Kirarin Revolution and also released music under the character's name. Kusumi also made crossover television and concert appearances as Kirari on Haromoni@ and Oha Suta, leading her to become closely associated with the character. The success of Kirarin Revolution and Kusumi's real-world appearances as Kirari made her one of the earliest examples of the "idol voice actor" crossover that became popular beginning in the late 2000s. Throughout the show's run, Kusumi also released music as groups Kira Pika and MilkyWay with other cast members. Kusumi was named #17 in Daitan Map's "Top 50 Voice Actors of Popular Characters" in 2007.

In early 2007, Kusumi became part of Morning Musume Tanjō 10nen Kinentai, a subgroup created to celebrate Morning Musume's 10th anniversary, with their first single, "Bokura ga Ikiru My Asia", releasing on January 24, 2007. In 2009, she released a song with the subgroup ZYX-α.

A manga adaptation by Rio Fujimi recounting Kusumi's rise to stardom was serialized in Ciao, titled Miracle Revolution: Koharu Kusumi's Story. Preferring the freedom she had working on her solo projects, Kusumi decided to pursue a solo career after Kirarin Revolution ended, mainly in modeling as well as other paths in entertainment, including comedy. On September 19, 2009, Tsunku announced that Kusumi would leave Morning Musume and Hello! Project on December 6, at the final performance of Morning Musume's 2009 fall tour, Nine Smile. Roughly 4,000 fans attended the graduation concert.

2010-2015: Solo television hosting and model runway debut

After graduating from Morning Musume, Kusumi continued to appear on Oha Suta, as well as Oha Coro. In January 2010, she joined other former Morning Musume members in the group Dream Morning Musume, which later debuted in April 2011. In July 2010, she performed with Li Chun, Qian Lin, and Miyabi Natsuyaki at the Shanghai World Expo 2010 under the group name Ex-ceed. 
From December 22–27, 2010, Kusumi appeared in the stage play Abe Naikaku alongside Natsumi Abe and Kei Yasuda.

Kusumi released an autobiography titled 17-sai no Tenshoku on February 12, 2011, which documented her childhood, Morning Musume, and interest in healthy lifestyles, all of which discussed her interest in pursuing a new career. She also appeared in a series of advertisements directed towards a healthy lifestyle.

In September 2011, Kusumi made her runway debut at the Kobe Collection 2011 Autumn/Winter Show. Beginning in the same month, she modeled exclusively for the fashion magazine CanCam, starting from the November 2011 issue  until the September 2015 issue. In 2012, Kusumi made runway appearances at the CanCam × AneCan Collaboration Fashion Show: Can Colle!, Stock Style 2012 Spring/Summer, and Girls Award 2012 Autumn/Winter shows. In 2013, she made runway appearances at the Girls Award 2013 Spring/Summer, Tokyo Girls Collection 2013 Spring Live, ReaMa Pastel Party 2013 in Tokyo Show, and Girls Award 2013 Autumn/Winter shows.

In 2014, Kusumi left Oha Suta and later hosted Blurred Sound Pops until 2015. She also starred in two live-action dramas, Inauguration! Girl's Cabinet, and Again!!.

In May 2015, Kusumi became a host of "Boat Race Live." on  BS Fuji.

In November 2015. Kusumi started working as a model for the fashion magazine "steady."

2016-present: Venture into acting

On January 9. 2016. Kusumi started hosting a weekly radio show called "This Happy Time (or KoHappy Time)." On April 1, 2016, Kusumi started hosting a second radio program called "Kusumi Koharu's Mediaship 927" on BSN also in Niigata, Japan.

On November 29, 2016, Kusumi announced that her contract with her talent agency, JP Room, would end on November 30. In early 2017 it was announced that Kusumi would be represented by Oscar Promotion, and would have a role as geisha in a drama called "Woman Prisoner 7."  

In October 2017, Kusumi appeared in the fifth season of the popular medical drama, Doctor-X as Nurse Haruna Nagamori.

On November 23, 2018, Kusumi appeared in a supporting role in the feature film, "Lady in White."

In 2019, Kusumi released a wall calendar  and appeared in the film "Shell and Joint."

Discography

As Kirari Tsukishima

Studio albums
 Mitsuboshi (2006)
 Kirarin Land (2007)
 Kirari to Fuyu (2008)

Compilation albums
 Best Kirari (2009)

Singles
 "Koi Kana" (2006)
 "Balalaika" (2006)
 "Happy" (2007)
 "Chance!" (2007)
 "Papancake" (2008)
 "Happy Happy Sunday!" (2009)

Publications

Photobooks

Autobiographies

Filmography

Television

Radio

Film

References

External links 

  
 

1992 births
Living people
Voice actresses from Niigata Prefecture
Japanese child actresses
Japanese voice actresses
21st-century Japanese women singers
21st-century Japanese singers
Japanese child singers
Japanese female idols
Japanese female models
Japanese female dancers
Morning Musume members
Dream Morning Musume members
Hello! Project solo singers
Musicians from Niigata Prefecture
Anime musicians
21st-century Japanese actresses